William Purvis (born 1948) is an American French horn player and conductor. He performs with the New York Woodwind Quintet, Speculum Musicae, Orpheus Chamber Orchestra, and the Orchestra of St. Luke's.  As of September 2016, he is director of the collection of musical instruments at Yale University's School of Music.

Purvis has taught at Columbia University, Juilliard, Yale University, Stony Brook University, SUNY Purchase and Hochschule für Musik in Karlsruhe, Germany.

He is a graduate of Haverford College and is currently married to pianist Mihae Lee.

External links
 Biography at Furious Artisans

References 

1948 births
American classical horn players
Living people
Academic staff of the Hochschule für Musik Karlsruhe